Compression Networks is a digital content delivery system developed by TV/COM International that evolved into the current DVB-S standard for satellite broadcasting.  The system provided MPEG2 video, audio, signalling, enhanced program guide, and conditional access for pay-television services like AlphaStar.

See also
 EchoStar

Satellite television
Broadcasting
Video